The Tarma Province is a Peruvian province, making up one of the nine provinces that conform the Junín Region.  To the north it borders with the Junín Province, the east with the Chanchamayo Province, the south with the Jauja Province and the west with the Yauli Province.

It is located in a position privileged, touristy and economic, halfway between the capital and the high forest, and point of convergence of various routes towards the central forest. The climate is temperate and mild during most of months predominates.

Geography 
Some of the highest mountains of the province are listed below:

Districts 

The province is divided into nine districts.

 Acobamba (Acobamba)
 Huaricolca (Huaricolca)
 Huasahuasi (Huasahuasi)
 La Unión (Leticia)
 Palca (Palca)
 Palcamayo (Palcamayo)
 San Pedro de Cajas (San Pedro de Cajas)
 Tapo (Tapo)
 Tarma (Tarma)

See also 
 Pampa Hermosa Reserved Zone
 Qanchisqucha (San Pedro de Cajas)
 Qanchisqucha (Huasahuasi)
 Tarmatampu
 Waskaqucha (Cajas)
 Waskaqucha (Huasahuasi, Huacuas)
 Waskaqucha (Huasahuasi, San Antonio)

References

External links 
 Official web site (Spanish)
 Places, Events, News and Topics of Tarma
 General Information of Tarma (English)
 General Information of Tarma (Spanish)

Provinces of the Junín Region